Daniel Weaver may refer to:

Daniel Weaver, a founder of Fremont, Michigan
Dan Weaver, fictional character
Daniel Weaver (MP) for Ballynakill (Parliament of Ireland constituency)
Daniel Weaver (actor), see List of Greek (TV series) characters
Daniel Weaver, finalist in Mister World 1998